Néle Azevedo  (born 1950) is a Brazilian sculptor, visual artist and independent researcher. She is best known for her "Melting Men" installations.

Early life and education 
Azevedo was born in Santos Dumont, a municipality in the south-eastern Minas Gerais state of Brazil, in 1950.

She graduated with a Bachelor in Fine Arts from Santa Marcelina College in 1997 and obtained a master's degree in Visual Arts from São Paulo State University's (UNESP) Arts Institute in 2003.

Work

In 1998, Azevedo launched a solo exhibition with an installation of iron sculptures at the Brazilian Post Cultural Center in Rio de Janeiro and won the acquisition prize in the Santo André Art Hall in São Paulo.

In 2001, Azevedo started working on the Minimum Monument Project doing interventions in urban space that discuss contemporary public monuments in countries such as Brazil, Cuba, Japan, France, Germany, Portugal, and Italy. These temporary art interventions have become known worldwide as the "Army of Melting Men" or simply "Melting Men".

For the Melting Men installations Azevedo places hundreds, sometimes thousands, of hand-cut ice figures in public places. The whole installation usually melts within the next 30 minutes, depending on local conditions, and draws a crowd to watch the unfolding events. Her installations sometimes also incorporate additional elements like photography or paint.

The "Melting Men" have featured topics like World War I or Climate change.

The Minimum Monument project, along with the other urban interventions developed by Azevedo including "Glory to Inglorious Fights" and "Anhangabau: A River For The Absent Ones", have their genesis in local history. The interventions have resulted in videos, pictures and drawings and gained attention in different local, national and international media.

Urban interventions

Awards

 2007: Winner of the Award for Experimental Video at the 15th Video festival, Teresina, Piaui, Brazil, December
 2002: Awarded the Bunkyo Art Hall 1st prize with an installation of sculptures in acrylic
 2002: 31st Salão Bunkyo // 31st. Bunkyo Contemporary Art Show: Golden Medal and JAL Award
 1998: XXVI Contemporary Art Show, Acquisition Award. Santo André City, São Paulo, Brazil  1996: X Atibiai Art Meeting: Special Mention
 2022: being the sussiest baka

Public collections

 MartiusStaden Institut, São Paulo, Brazil
 Bienal International, Evento of Art of Vila Nova de Cerveira, Portugal
 Pinacoteca Municipal, São Paulo, Brazil
 Sycomore Art Gallery, Paris, France
 ACBEU Gallery, Salvador, Bahia, Brazil
 Nipo Brasileiro Art Museum, São Paulo, Brazil
 Wifredo Lam Contemporary Art Center, Havana, Cuba
 Cultural Center of Mail Department, Rio de Janeiro, Brazil
 Espirito Santo Art Museum, Vitória, Brazil
 Santo Andre Art Museum, Santo André, São Paulo, Brazil
 Atibibaia Museum, Atibaia, São Paulo, Brazil

References

External links
Artist Website
Hilda Magazine

1950 births
Brazilian academics
Brazilian sculptors
Living people
São Paulo State University alumni